Winthrop Public Schools is the school district of Winthrop, Massachusetts.

Lisa Howard (née Gill) became the superintendent in 2018.

 the enrollment was above 1,900.

Schools
 Winthrop High School (grades 9–12)
 Winthrop Middle School (grades 6–8)
 Note: Winthrop Middle School and Winthrop High School are housed in the same building, but are two separate and distinct schools with their own administration.
 Arthur T. Cummings Elementary (grades 3–5)
 William P. Gorman/Fort Banks Elementary School (Preschool-2nd grade)

Former schools:
 A.W. Dalrymple School
 E.B. Newton School
 N.E. Willis School

References

External links
 Winthrop Public Schools
 Winthrop Public School District - Massachusetts School Building Authority
School districts in Massachusetts
Winthrop, Massachusetts
Education in Suffolk County, Massachusetts